The following is a list of episodes from the USA Network original series The Dead Zone. The series premiered on June 16, 2002, and ended on September 16, 2007, with a total of 80 episodes over the course of 6 seasons.

Series overview

Episodes

Season 1 (2002)

Season 2 (2003)

Season 3 (2004)

Season 4 (2005)

Season 5 (2006)

Season 6 (2007)

References

Episodes
Lists of American science fiction television series episodes